The Little Accident is a 1930 American pre-Code comedy film directed by William James Craft and written by Gladys Lehman and Gene Towne, based on the 1927 novel An Unmarried Father by Floyd Dell and the 1928 play Little Accident by Dell and Thomas Mitchell. The film stars Douglas Fairbanks, Jr., Anita Page, Sally Blane, ZaSu Pitts, Joan Marsh, and Roscoe Karns. The film was released on August 3, 1930, by Universal Pictures. It was remade by Universal in 1939 as Little Accident, and by RKO Radio Pictures in 1944 with Gary Cooper as Casanova Brown.

Plot
On the day before his second wedding, a man finds out that his bride-to-be has had a baby.

Cast 
Douglas Fairbanks, Jr. as Norman Overbeck
Anita Page as Isabel
Sally Blane as Madge
ZaSu Pitts as Monica
Joan Marsh as Doris
Roscoe Karns as Gilbert
Slim Summerville as Hicks
Henry Armetta as Rudolpho Amendelara
Myrtle Stedman as Mrs. Overbeck
Albert Gran as Mr. Overbeck
Nora Cecil as Dr. Zernecke
Bertha Mann as Miss Hemingway
Gertrude Short as Miss Clark
Dot Farley as Mrs. Van Dine

See also
 A Father Without Knowing It (1932)
 Unexpected Father (1939)
 Casanova Brown (1944)
 Broadway comedy Little Accident (1928)

References

External links

1930 films
1930 comedy films
American black-and-white films
American comedy films
1930s English-language films
Films based on adaptations
Films based on American novels
American films based on plays
Films directed by William James Craft
Universal Pictures films
1930s American films